Beach Bunny is an American rock band formed in 2015 by Lili Trifilio in Chicago, Illinois. The group achieved widespread popularity after their song "Prom Queen" went viral on TikTok.

History
Beach Bunny began as a bedroom-based solo project in 2015 when Lili Trifilio recorded a song titled "6 Weeks". The same year, Trifilio released her first EP, titled Animalism. She released her second EP titled Pool Party in 2016. In 2017, she released her third EP titled Crybaby, and Beach Bunny expanded to a full four-piece lineup shortly after. In 2018, Beach Bunny released her fourth EP, titled Prom Queen.

On October 31, 2019, Trifilio and the band announced that they had signed to Mom + Pop Music and released their first full-length album, Honeymoon, on February 14, 2020. The album was produced by Joe Reinhart  at Electrical Audio; the Chicago studio owned by Steve Albini, and subsequently mixed at Reinhart's Headroom Studios. Honeymoon was met with widespread critical acclaim, appearing on the Best Albums of 2020 lists in both The New York Times, and Rolling Stone. The album contained the song "Cloud 9", which became the band's second song to go viral on TikTok, where it was used in 2 million videos.

In November 2020, the band released a new single titled "Good Girls (Don't Get Used)". Their fifth EP, Blame Game, was released in 2021.

In October 2021, the band released the single "Oxygen". This was followed by the single "Fire Escape" in March 2022, along with the announcement of their sophomore album Emotional Creature, released on July 22, 2022.

Band members
Current
Lili Trifilio – vocals, guitar,  songwriter and lyricist (2015–present)
Jon Alvarado – drums (2017–present)
Anthony Vaccaro – bass (2019–present)

Former
Aidan Cada – bass (2017–2019)
Matt Henkels – guitar (2017–2022)

Discography

Studio albums

Compilation albums

Extended plays

Singles

Notes

References

External links 
 Beach Bunny on Twitter

Musical groups from Chicago
Musical groups established in 2015
2015 establishments in Illinois
American indie pop groups
Triple Crown Records artists
Mom + Pop Music artists